Sidney High School is a public secondary school in  Sidney, New York, approximately 30 miles north of Binghamton. The school is known primarily for its athletics programs, music, and Slam poetry contest.

History
The Sidney Union School served high school students prior to a separate high school being constructed in 1892.

Campus
Sidney High School is located on the same campus as the middle school and elementary school, all of which comprise the Sidney Central School District.

Curriculum

Extracurricular Activities

Sports

The school has a rich history in athletics. Sidney competes in the Midstate Athletic Conference (MAC). Sidney has three NYSPHSAA Boys' Basketball State Championships (1976, 1998, 2007), one Field Hockey NYS Championship (1991) and one Football NYS Championship (2005).  The school has also produced countless individual Section IV and NYS Championships in Boys' and Girls' Track and Wrestling. In 1990, Jennifer Finnegan won a National Title for the Mile Run for winter track.

Notable alumni
James Axtell, historian
Marc Cerbone, professional baseball player
 Jessica Kent, YouTuber

References

External links
Sidney Central School Alumni Association

Public high schools in New York (state)
Schools in Delaware County, New York